Aurora Borealis is an American black metal band from Waldorf, Maryland. The band was founded by guitarist Ron Vento and drummer Tony Laureano in 1994. In 1996 they released their first EP, Mansions of Eternity. In 2013, the band signed with Xtreem Music.

Band members

Current members
Ron Vento - guitars, vocals, bass, keyboards
Mark Green - drums and percussion
Eddie Rossi - bass

Discography
Mansions of Eternity (EP, 1996)
Praise the Archaic Lights Embrace (CD, 1998)
Northern Lights (CD, 2000)
Time Unveiled (CD, 2002)
Relinquish (CD, 2006)
Timeline: The Beginning and End of Everything (CD, 2011)
Worldshapers (CD, 2014)
Apokalupsis (CD, 2018)
Prophecy Is the Mold in Which History Is Poured (CD, 2022)

References

Heavy metal musical groups from Maryland
Musical groups established in 1994
American musical trios
Heavy metal musical groups from Washington, D.C.
1994 establishments in Maryland
Waldorf, Maryland